Seaman's Beverages was a family-run business involved in the manufacturing of carbonated beverages. It was established in 1939 by F.R. Seaman, and operated independently until 2002 where it was sold to The Pepsi Bottling Group. Only two of the beverage flavours survive to this day, being sold in aluminum cans and plastic bottles instead of glass bottles.

History 
The business was founded in 1939 by F. R. Seaman, after he acquired a loan of $2,500 from one of his cousins. He operated out of an old brick building that also served as his residence in the early years. He delivered soda to local stores in the backseat of his Ford jalopy. F. R Seaman married Jean MacLeod.

Sometime in the 1960s, Seaman's obtained a license to bottle Pepsi Cola products, and as a result, the factory had to be expanded. They were encouraged to stop producing their own brand and exclusively produce Pepsi Cola products, but they refused, because the Seaman's branded products have always done well.

The last owner of the business was Rundell Seaman, who sold the business to The Pepsi Bottling Group in 2002. Before the sale there was 11 different flavours, that was quickly reduced to 4–5, and then two. (Orange and Ginger Ale)

The bottling plant in Charlottetown was closed down and converted into a depot for soda produced in Moncton. The Moncton bottling plant took over production for the brand. 

Before the acquisition, Seaman's products were sold around the Maritimes, Toronto, and Montreal. Before the brand was discontinued it is mostly sold in Prince Edward Island, but they could occasionally be found elsewhere in the Maritimes.

Pepsi distribution on Prince Edward Island is now managed by a local company, and the depot has been occupied by a local food products supplier.

In 2010, The Pepsi Bottling Group and PepsiAmericas were purchased by PepsiCo. 

In early 2020, Pepsi discounted the brand due to low demand.

Flavours 
Over its history, the company has produced a range of flavours, including:

 Olde Fashioned Orange (Current Flavour)
 Diet Orange with Sucralose
 Cream Soda
 Ginger Ale (Current Flavour)
 Ginger Brew
 Birch Beer
 Grapefruit and Lime
 Lime Rickey
 Root Beer

References 

PepsiCo bottlers
Companies based in Prince Edward Island
Drink companies of Canada
Canadian companies established in 1939